Didn't See Me Coming is the seventh studio album by American singer Keith Sweat. It was released by Elektra Records on November 14, 2000, in the United States. The album was certified Gold by the Recording Industry Association of America (RIAA) on January 24, 2001.

Critical reception
Entertainment Weekly wrote that "the former new-jack maestro grooves as compellingly and aches as convincingly as ever."

Track listing

Personnel
 Keith Sweat – Producer, Executive Producer
 Busta Rhymes – Performer
 Lil' Mo – Arranger, Vocal Arrangement
 Rah Digga – Performer
 Andrew Lane – Producer, Writer

Charts

Weekly charts

Year-end charts

Certifications

References

2000 albums
Keith Sweat albums
Elektra Records albums